The Nuestra Señora del Pilar de Zaragoza Church, also known as the Virgin of the Pillar Parish Church or simply Sibonga Church, is a Roman Catholic church in Sibonga, Cebu, Philippines.

Background
It was established as a vista of Carcar in 1690 by the Augustinians. The site became a parish dedicated to the Our Lady of the Pillar of Zaragoza in 1830 with the initial church building made in wood. A convent made in stone and coral was built according to the design of Bishop Santos Gómez Marañón of Cebu under the watch of Fr. Prospero Puerto in 1939. The current church building made in stone and coral was built from 1866 to 1898. The building is an example of Neo-Gothic architecture

The church building was renovated under Fr. Francisco Latorre and was inaugurated on November 17, 1907, by Manila Archbishop Jeremiah Harty.

The Sibonga Church is also noted for its interior artworks, especially its ceiling mural. Parish priest Julio Fernandez commissioned Cebuano artist Raymundo Francia who accomplished the artworks from 1927 to 1931. Francia's ceiling mural is noted by the historical marker at the church to be an example of trompe-l'œil.

A historical marker was unveiled at Sibonga Church on December 2, 2010, by the National Historical Commission of the Philippines. It is recognized as a Level II historical site.

References

Churches completed in 1898
Buildings and structures in Cebu
Roman Catholic churches in Cebu
Churches in the Roman Catholic Archdiocese of Cebu
19th-century religious buildings and structures in the Philippines